Cat Chaser is a 1989 American heist film directed by Abel Ferrara and starring Peter Weller and Kelly McGillis, based on the 1982 novel of the same name by Elmore Leonard. It was adapted from the novel by Leonard and James Borelli.

A three-hour raw cut of Cat Chaser was screened at Anthology Film Archives in New York City in the summer of 2014. Ferrara, Weller and others involved have expressed unhappiness with the released version, particularly with the added omniscient narration. (Weller refused to provide this narration, so producers Peter Davis and William Panzer hired actor Reni Santoni instead).

Plot

George Moran is a former Marine and veteran of the Dominican Republic intervention who now runs a small beachfront motel in Miami. While searching for a Dominican woman named Luci Palma who saved his life in 1965 (and gave him the nickname "Cat Chaser"), he begins a relationship with Mary DeBoya, the wealthy, unhappy wife of a sadistic former Dominican general. Moran gets involved in a plot by fellow military veteran Nolen Tyner and a former New York policeman, Jiggs Scully, to rip off the general. Moran must elude a number of double-crosses as he and Mary attempt to gain her freedom plus $2 million of the general's money.

Cast
 Peter Weller as George Moran
 Kelly McGillis as Mary DeBoya
 Charles Durning as "Jiggs" Scully
 Frederic Forrest as Nolen Tyner
 Tomás Milián as Andres DeBoya
 Maria M. Ruperto as Luci Palma
 Juan Fernández de Alarcon as Rafi

Production
The film was shot in Old San Juan, Miami and Coral Gables, Florida, as the crew decided shooting on location in Santo Domingo would be too dangerous and costly after scouting there.

Filming was not a happy experience for McGillis, who didn't make another major film afterwards for almost a decade. She said in 2001: "It was the most hateful experience of my life, and I said, if this is what acting is going to be, I will not do it. On the last day of shooting, I said to Abel 'Are you done with me?' He said, 'Yeah.' I walked in my trailer and shaved my head. I said 'Screw you, I never want to act again.'"

In a 2015 oral history of the making of Cat Chaser, written by Sam Weisberg of Hidden Films, Peter Weller and various crew members acknowledged that Weller and McGillis openly clashed during filming; Weller maintained that he never found out the reason for it. Several crew members confirmed that McGillis stormed off the set after shooting a love scene with Weller, but they differed on the exact cause of her outburst.

Abel Ferrara felt that the rape scene was too physical, so he wanted to have a body double shoot it. According to Ferrara, Kelly McGillis was very upset when she learned she wouldn't be shooting the scene. He said that McGillis accused him of replacing her because he didn't think she was beautiful enough. Eventually, McGillis and Ferrara worked out the scene in a way that she could film it herself. Ferrara claims that the actress essentially wrote the scene herself.

Critical evaluation
The film received mixed reviews. It currently has a 40% approval rating on Rotten Tomatoes, based on 5 reviews, with a weighted average of 4.85/10. Variety wrote: "Despite a fine cast and atmospheric direction by Abel Ferrara, the pic doesn't quite make the grade, though it certainly is worth a look." Entertainment Weekly called the film "baroquely sleazy" and wrote that it failed to make sense. The Roanoke Times described the film: "Despite some serious flaws, Cat Chaser is one of the better screen adaptations of an Elmore Leonard novel". Weller was criticized for his "stiff performance" by Mick Martin and Marsha Porter in The Video Movie Guide 1995.

Awards and nominations
Cat Chaser was nominated for the Best Film award at Mystfest in 1989.

Home video release
The film was released on VHS tape in the United States in 1991 by Vestron Video and the UK in 1994 by 4 Front and for the first time on DVD in 2003 by Lion's Gate/Artisan, and issued in the UK in 2004 by Arrow Films. The Lion's Gate DVD featured Weller and McGillis on the cover with the text "Passion. Greed. Murder. Tonight They Pay," with the story marketed as an erotic thriller.

References

External links
 
 

1989 films
1989 crime drama films
1989 independent films
American heist films
Films based on works by Elmore Leonard
Films directed by Abel Ferrara
Films produced by William N. Panzer
Films set in the Dominican Republic
Films shot in Puerto Rico
Films shot in Miami
Films about domestic violence
American independent films
1980s English-language films
1980s American films